Rampurhat subdivision is an administrative subdivision of Birbhum district in the state of West Bengal, India.

Overview
The northern portion of Rampurhat subdivision is part of the Nalhati Plains, a sub-micro physiographic region, and the southern portion is part of the Brahmani-Mayurakshi Basin, another sub-micro physiographic region occupying the area between the Brahmani in the north and the Mayurakshi in the south. There is an occasional intrusion of Rajmahal Hills, from adjoining Santhal Parganas, towards the north-western part of the subdivision.

Geography

Subdivisions
Birbhum district is divided into the following administrative subdivisions:

Administrative units

Rampurhat subdivision has 5 police stations, 8 community development blocks, 8 panchayat samitis, 65 gram panchayats, 760 mouzas, 725 inhabited villages, 2 municipalities and 6 census towns. The municipalities are: Rampurhat and Nalhati. The census towns are: Murarai, Barua Gopalpur, Ambhua, Kashimnagar, Bishnupur and Fatehpur. The subdivision has its headquarters at Rampurhat.

Police stations
Police stations in Rampurhat subdivision have the following features and jurisdiction:

Blocks
Community development blocks in Rampurhat subdivision are:

Gram panchayats
The subdivision contains 65 gram panchayats under 8 community development blocks:

 Mayureswar I block consists of nine gram panchayats, viz. Baraturigram, Dakshingram, Mollarpur–I, Bajitpur, Jhikodda, Mollarpur–II, Dabuk, Kanachi and Talowan.
 Mayureswar II block consists of nine gram panchayats, viz. Daspalsa, Kaleswar, Mayureswar, Ulkunda, Dheka, Kundola and Satpalsa.
 Rampurhat I block consists of nine gram panchayats, viz. Ayas, Dakhalbati, Kusumba, Bonhat, Kasthagara, Mashra, Barshal, Kharun and Narayanpur.
 Rampurhat II block consists of nine gram panchayats, viz. Bishnupur, Budhigram, Hansan–I, Margram–I, Hansan–II, Margram–II, Dunigram, Kaluha and Sahapur.
 Murarai I block consists of seven gram panchayats, viz. Chatra, Gorsha, Murarai, Rajgram, Dumurgram, Mahurapur and Palsa.
 Murarai II block consists of rural areas with nine gram panchayats, viz. Amdole, Kushmore–II, Paikar–I, Jajigram, Mitrapur, Paikar–II, Kushmore–I, Nandigram and Rudranagar.
 Nalhati I block consists of rural areas with nine gram panchayats, viz. Banior, Haridaspur, Kaitha–II, Barla, Kalitha, Kurumgram, Bautia, Kaitha–I and Paikpara.
 Nalhati II block consists of nine gram panchayats, viz. Bara–I, Bhadrapur–I, Noapara, Bara–II, Bhadrapur–II and Shitalgram.

Education
Birbhum district had a literacy rate of 70.68% as per the provisional figures of the census of India 2011. Rampurhat subdivision had a literacy rate of 69.12%, Suri Sadar subdivision 71.16% and Bolpur subdivision 72.71%.
  
Given in the table below (data in numbers) is a comprehensive picture of the education scenario in Birbhum district, with data for the year 2013-14:

The following institutions are located in Rampurhat subdivision:
Rampurhat College was established at Rampurhat in 1950.
Asleha Girls College was established at Rampurhat in 2009.
Rampurhat Government Polytechnic was established at Rampurhat in 2015.
Hiralal Bhakat College was established at Nalhati in 1986.
Sofia Girls College was established at Nalhati in 2009.
Nalhati Government Polytechnic was established at Nalhati in 2015.
Lokepara Mahavidyalaya was established at Lokpara in 2010.
Turku Hansda-Lapsa Hemram Mahavidyalaya was established at Madian in 2006.
Kabi Nazrul College was established at Murarai in 1985.
Murarai Government Polytechnic was established at Murarai in 2015.

Healthcare
Medical facilities in Rampurhat subdivision are as follows:

Hospitals: (Name, location, beds)

Rampurhat Government Medical College and Hospital.

Rampurhat Subdivisional Hospital, Rampurhat, 286 beds
Rampurhat Railway Hospital, Rampurhat, 2 beds

Rural Hospitals: (Name, CD Block, location, beds)
Murarai Rural Hospital, Murarai I CD Block, Murarai, 50 beds
Paikar Rural Hospital, Murarai II CD Block, Paikar, 30 beds
Nalhati Rural Hospital, Nalhati I CD Block, Nalhati, 30 beds
Baswa Rural Hospital, Rampurhat II CD Block, Baswa, 30 beds
Mallarpur Rural Hospital, Mayureswar I CD Block, Mallarpur, 30 beds
Satpalsa (Basudebpur) Rural Hospital, Mayureswar II CD Block, PO Basudebpur, 30 beds

Block Primary Health Centres: (Name, CD Block, location, beds)
Lohapur Block Primary Health Centre, Nalhati II CD Block, Lohapur, 15 beds
Chakmandala Block Primary Health Centre, Rampurhat II CD Block, Chakmandala, 15 beds

Primary Health Centres: (CD Block-wise)(CD Block, PHC location, beds)

Murarai I CD Block: Rajgram (10), Chatra (6)
Murarai II CD Block: Jajigram (10), Rudranagar (10), Bhimpur (6)
Nalhati I CD Block: Kaitha (6), Kurumgram (6), Sonarkundu (10)
Nalhati II CD Block: Sitalgram (6), Bhadrapur (10)
Rampurhat I CD Block: Kasthagara (6), Baidara (PO Haridaspur) (10), Udaypur (PO Dhekuria) (6), Narayanpur (10)
Rampurhat II CD Block: Tarapur (6), Margram (10), Dunigram (6)
Mayureswar I CD Block: Talwa (6), Ratma (PO Daksingram) (6)
Mayureswar II CD Block: Noapara-Ulkunda (PO Gunutia) (10), Dheka (PO Kuliara) (6) and Hatinagar (PO Kotasur) (6)

Electoral constituencies
Lok Sabha (parliamentary) and Vidhan Sabha (state assembly) constituencies in Rampurhat subdivision were as follows:

References

Subdivisions of West Bengal
Subdivisions in Birbhum district
Birbhum district